Silkie Carlo (born 1989) has been the director of the British civil liberties NGO Big Brother Watch since 2018.

She worked on the defence fund for Edward Snowden and appears in the 2020 American documentary film Coded Bias. With Arjen Kamphuis, she co-authored Information Security for Journalists, commissioned by the Centre for Investigative Journalism. She has been an organizer of CryptoParty events in London.

Before starting her role at Big Brother Watch in January 2018, she worked at the human rights organisation Liberty. She was Senior Advocacy Officer, led work on Technology and Human Rights, and drove a legal challenge to the Investigatory Powers Act 2016.

References

Living people
21st-century British people
British civil rights activists
1989 births